The 13th legislature of the French Fifth Republic was the parliamentary cycle started in June 2007 and lasted until June 2012. It was created after the 2007 legislative election that took place on 10 and 17 June 2007. The parliamentary majority belonged to the conservative Union for a Popular Movement (UMP), and supported the François Fillon government.

Composition

13th Assembly by Parliamentary Group

French Parliament
National Assembly (France)
2000s in politics